Tissanga murphyi is a moth in the family Eupterotidae. It was described by Thierry Bouyer in 2012. It is found in Malawi.

References

Moths described in 2012
Eupterotidae